The Canadian Martyrs, also known as the North American Martyrs (French: Saints martyrs canadiens, Holy Canadian Martyrs), were eight Jesuit missionaries from Sainte-Marie among the Hurons. They were ritually tortured and killed on various dates in the mid-17th century in Canada, in what is now southern Ontario, and in upstate New York, during the warfare between the Iroquois (particularly the Mohawk people) and the Huron. They have subsequently been canonized and venerated as martyrs by the Catholic Church.

The martyrs are St. René Goupil (1642), St. Isaac Jogues (1646), St. Jean de Lalande (1646), St. Antoine Daniel (1648), St. Jean de Brébeuf (1649), St. Noël Chabanel (1649),  St. Charles Garnier (1649), and St. Gabriel Lalemant (1649).

Background
Jesuit missionaries worked among the Huron (Wendat), an Iroquoian-speaking people who occupied territory in the Georgian Bay area of Central Ontario. (They were not part of the Iroquois Confederacy, initially made up of five tribes south and east of the Great Lakes.) The area of their traditional territory is called Huronia. The Huron in this area were farmers, fishermen and traders who lived in villages surrounded by defensive wooden palisades for protection. Sainte-Marie among the Hurons was the headquarters for the French Jesuit Mission to the Huron Wendat people.

By the late 1640s, the Jesuits believed they were making progress in their mission to the Huron, and claimed to have made many converts. But, the priests were not universally trusted.  Many Huron considered them to be malevolent shamans who brought death and disease wherever they travelled; after European contact, the Huron had suffered high fatalities in epidemics after 1634 of smallpox and other Eurasian infectious diseases.

The nations of the Iroquois Confederacy considered the Jesuits legitimate targets of their raids and warfare, as the missionaries were nominally allies of the Huron and French fur traders. Retaliating for French colonial attacks against the Iroquois was also a reason for their raids against the Huron and Jesuits.

In 1642, the Mohawk captured René Goupil, and Father Isaac Jogues, bringing them back to their village of Ossernenon south of the Mohawk River. They ritually tortured both men and killed Goupil. After several months of captivity, Jogues was ransomed by Dutch traders and the minister Johannes Megapolensis from New Netherland (later Albany). He returned for a time to France, but then sailed back to Quebec. In 1646 he and Jean de Lalande were killed during a visit to Ossernenon intended to achieve peace between the French and the Mohawk.

Other Jesuit missionaries were killed by the Mohawk and martyred in the following years: Antoine Daniel (1648), Jean de Brébeuf (1649), Noël Chabanel (1649), Charles Garnier (1649), and Gabriel Lalemant (1649). All were canonized in 1930 as the Canadian Martyrs, also known as the North American Martyrs.

Legacy and honours

The martyrs were canonized by Pope Pius XI in 1930.  They are collectively the secondary patron saints of Canada. St. René Goupil, St. Isaac Jogues, and St. Jean de Lalande are the first three U.S. saints, martyred at Ossernenon, 9 miles (14.5 km) west of the confluence of the Schoharie and Mohawk rivers. Their feast day is celebrated in the General Roman Calendar and in the United States on October 19 under the title of "John de Brébeuf and Isaac Jogues, Priests, and Companions, Martyrs," and in Canada on September 26.

The Martyrs' Shrine in Midland, Ontario, the site of the Jesuits' missionary work among the Huron, is the National Shrine to the Canadian Martyrs.

A National Shrine of the North American Martyrs has been constructed and dedicated in Auriesville, New York. It is located south of the Mohawk River, near a Jesuit cemetery containing remains of missionaries who died in the area from 1669 to 1684, when the Jesuits had a local mission to the Mohawk.

Churches dedicated to the Canadian Martyrs
Churches dedicated to the martyrs include the following:
National Shrine of the North American Martyrs in Auriesville, New York.  
Nostra Signora del Santissimo Sacramento e Santi Martiri Canadesi, the Canadian national church in Rome
 Martyrs' Shrine in Midland, Ontario 
 Canadian Martyrs Church in Halifax, Nova Scotia
 Canadian Martyrs Parish in Richmond, British Columbia
 Canadian Martyrs Parish in Invermere, BC
 The parish of Saints-Martyrs-Canadiens  founded in 1961 in St. Boniface (now part of Winnipeg), Manitoba
 North American Martyrs Parish and School in Monroeville, Pennsylvania
 North American Martyrs Catholic Church in Lincoln, Nebraska
 North American Martyrs Catholic Church in Auburn, Massachusetts
 North American Martyrs Catholic Church, a parish of the Priestly Fraternity of St. Peter in Seattle, Washington
 American Martyrs Parish in Manhattan Beach, California
 American Martyrs Roman Catholic Church in Bayside, New York.
 American Martyrs Catholic Church in Kingsford, Michigan.
 The Chapel of the North American Martyrs at the University of Detroit Jesuit High School Detroit, Michigan
 The Chapel of the North American Martyrs at Jesuit High School New Orleans New Orleans, Louisiana
The Chapel of the North American Martyrs at Walsh Jesuit High School in Cuyahoga Falls, Ohio
The Kaboni Catholic Church (St. Anthony Daniel Parish), located in Wiikwemkoong First Nation, Ontario.
 Canadian Martyrs' Church in Hamilton, Ontario
 St-Charles Garnier Church in Hamilton Ontario
 The parishes of Saints-Martyrs-Canadiens in Montréal, in the City of Québec, in Victoriaville, in Trois-Rivières, and in Beauharnois (province of Québec, Canada).
 Holy Martyrs of North America Catholic Church in Falmouth, Maine.

Schools dedicated to the Canadian Martyrs
Many schools also honour the martyrs, including the following:
 The sports teams of the Pontifical North American College in Rome
 Elementary schools named after them in Newmarket, Ontario, East York, Ontario, Hamilton, Ontario, Burlington, Ontario, Penetanguishene, Ontario, and Victoria Harbour, Ontario
 Jesuit High School in Sacramento, California, where each building on the campus has been named after one of the saints
 Jesuit High School in New Orleans, Louisiana
Walsh Jesuit High School in Cuyahoga Falls, Ohio, which holds the martyrs as their patron saints. Walsh Jesuit's chapel is named in their honour.
 Brebeuf College School, Jesuit (formerly) Catholic Secondary School in Willowdale (north Toronto) established in 1963, named after St. Jean de Brébeuf

Municipality named after the Canadian Martyrs
 The parish municipality of Saints-Martyrs-Canadiens, in Quebec, Canada

The torture of the martyrs by the Iroquois is the subject depicted in the twelve-light World War I memorial window (1933) by Charles William Kelsey at the Loyola College (Montreal) chapel, at the Chapel of Our Lady of Lourdes on the campus of Georgetown Preparatory School in North Bethesda, Maryland, and a side shine at Madonna Della Strada Chapel on the campus of Loyola University Chicago. Fordham University additionally has named the Martyrs' Court residential complex in their collective honour, as well as individual halls in the complex being named for Jogues, Goupil and Lalande. The North American College in Rome has a crypt chapel dedicated to the North American Martyrs.

The martyrs are also honoured at Camp Ondessonk, a Catholic summer camp in Ozark, Illinois, where each unit of cabins is named after one of the martyrs, and also at the American Martyrs Retreat House in Cedar Falls, Iowa.

See also
Jesuit missions in North America
Christian martyrs
Martyrs' Shrine
National Shrine of the North American Martyrs

References

Further reading

Jesuit martyrs
Canadian Roman Catholic saints
Canadian
Canadian
History of Catholicism in Canada
History of Catholicism in the United States
People of New France
Groups of Roman Catholic saints
Martyred groups
1642 deaths
Canadian martyrs
Canadian torture victims
1642 in the Thirteen Colonies
2017 in Canada
17th century in the Province of New York
17th century in Ontario